The 2022 Turkish Masters (officially the 2022 Nirvana Turkish Masters) was a professional snooker tournament that took place from 7 to 13 March 2022 at the Nirvana Cosmopolitan Hotel in Antalya, Turkey. The 13th ranking event of the 2021–22 snooker season, it was the inaugural staging of the Turkish Masters and the first time that a professional snooker event had been staged in Turkey. The tournament was originally scheduled to take place from 27 September to 3 October 2021, but the World Snooker Tour postponed it until March 2022 due to the COVID-19 pandemic and the 2021 Turkey wildfires. Qualification matches were played from 2 to 6 February 2022 at the Morningside Arena in Leicester, England. The tournament was broadcast by Turkish Radio and Television Corporation  domestically in Turkey, and Eurosport in Europe.

Judd Trump won the event, defeating Matthew Selt 10–4 in the final, to capture his 23rd ranking title and his first ranking tournament of the season. He made a maximum break, the sixth of his career and the highest of the tournament, in the 10th frame of the final.

Format
The event was the first edition of the Turkish Masters, the first time a snooker world ranking event was played in Turkey. It took place from 7 to 13 March 2022 at the Nirvana Cosmopolitan Hotel in Antalya. Organised by the World Snooker Tour, it was the 13th ranking event of the 2021–22 snooker season, following the Welsh Open and preceding the Gibraltar Open. Originally scheduled to take place from 27 September to 3 October 2021, it was postponed until March 2022 due to the COVID-19 pandemic and the 2021 Turkey wildfires. This postponement also affected the qualifying round, which was held from 2 to 6 February 2022 at the Morningside Arena in Leicester.  The tournament was broadcast by the Turkish Radio and Television Corporation in Turkey and Eurosport in Europe. The event was also shown on Liaoning TV, Superstar online, Kuaishou, Migu, Youku and Huya.com in China; Premier Sports Network in the Philippines; Now TV in Hong Kong; True Sport in Thailand; Sports Cast in Taiwan; and Astro SuperSports in Malaysia. In all other territories, the event was available from Matchroom Sport.

World number two Ronnie O'Sullivan declined to enter the tournament because he was not offered any additional financial incentive. WPBSA chairman Jason Ferguson stated that although he was disappointed by O'Sullivan's decision, the governing body had to maintain a level playing field and would not offer players extra money to appear in tournaments. World number four Neil Robertson and reigning world champion Mark Selby both withdrew for personal reasons. This meant that three of the top four players in the world rankings did not participate.

Prize fund
There was a total prize fund of £500,000, with the winner receiving £100,000. A breakdown of prize money for the event is shown below:

 Winner: £100,000
 Runner-up: £45,000
 Semi-final: £20,000
 Quarter-final: £12,500
 Last 16: £7,500
 Last 32: £5,500
 Last 64: £3,500
 Highest break: £5,000
 Total: £500,000

Summary

Opening ceremony incident 
Robert Milkins arrived intoxicated at the tournament's opening ceremony, held at the Nirvana Cosmopolitan Hotel on 6 March, after drinking heavily to celebrate his birthday. He had verbal altercations with other players and hotel guests, attempted to punch WPBSA chairman Jason Ferguson, fell and cut his chin in the toilets, and was taken to hospital by fellow professional Jimmy Robertson, where he had his stomach pumped. Although Milkins apologised to the event organisers and hotel management for his behaviour, he stated that he narrowly avoided being removed from the tournament. The World Snooker Tour referred Milkins to the sport's governing body over the incident. At a disciplinary hearing, Milkins accepted that he had brought the sport into disrepute with his behaviour and breached his player's contract with World Snooker Ltd. He was fined £6,000 and ordered to pay an additional £1,000 for the costs of the hearing. Milkins later disclosed that he had received counseling after the incident through footballer Tony Adams’ mental health charity Sporting Chance, which he credited with helping him turn his career around. Milkins went on to win his first two ranking titles at the 2022 Gibraltar Open and the 2023 Welsh Open.

Early rounds 
In the round of 64, John Higgins made two century breaks, including a 128 in the final frame, to defeat the EBSA European Under-21 Snooker Championships winner Dylan Emery 5–2. Emery, playing as an amateur, had already gained a place on the World Snooker Tour from the 2022–23 snooker season. Higgins predicted Emery would "do well" on the tour, but said he was still "raw". Si Jiahui, another amateur player, defeated world number 13 Anthony McGill 5–2. Oliver Lines trailed by 50 points in the deciding frame against Xiao Guodong, but won the match with a 69 clearance. Shaun Murphy, yet to reach a ranking semi-final in the season, whitewhashed Lyu Haotian in 63 minutes, making breaks of 64, 59, and 58. Ding Junhui, who had slipped to 32nd in the world rankings, fell 1–4 behind against Milkins, but then took four consecutive frames with breaks of 131, 105, 81, and 55 to win 5–4. World number three Judd Trump defeated Chris Wakelin 5–3. Jak Jones took a 4–2 lead against 11th seed Mark Allen. Even though Allen drew level, Jones made a break of 79 in the deciding frame to record one of the biggest wins of his career. 

In the round of 32, Matthew Selt defeated Zhao Xintong 5–2, winning the first three frames on the colours, and later making breaks of 70 and 80. Higgins whitewashed Michael Holt 5–0, making breaks of 121, 54, and 69, while Si reached the last 16 by defeating Tom Ford 5–1. Ding won the opening frame against Kyren Wilson, but Wilson won three in a row to take a 3–1 lead. After the interval, Ding produced a run of 255 points without reply, including breaks of 73, 105, and 100, and then won a scrappy eighth frame on the pink to defeat Wilson 5–3. Trump made a 116 break in his first frame against Liang, but Liang won four in a row to lead 4–1. He had chances to win the match in the sixth and seventh frames, but missed crucial pots, allowing Trump to take the match to a decider, which he won. Ali Carter lost the first three frames against Matthew Stevens but came back to win with a clearance in the decider.

In the round of 16, Graeme Dott defeated Higgins in a deciding frame. Ding also defeated Si in a decider, making breaks of 64, 93, 73, 127, 105, and 97 to reach his first ranking quarter-final since the 2021 German Masters. Selt defeated Thepchaiya Un-Nooh 5–1, making breaks of 72, 80, and 61. Trump came back from 3–4 behind to beat Zhou Yuelong 5–4. Zhou had chances to win the match in the eighth frame, but Trump won it on the colours after snookering Zhou on the yellow, and then won the decider after Zhou missed a difficult pot on a red to a centre pocket. Oliver Lines defeated Yan Bingtao in a 45-minute deciding frame to reach the first ranking quarter-final of his career, while Carter whitewashed Sam Craigie 5–0, including a break of 135. Murphy made breaks of 51, 70, 69, 81, 61 and 65 to defeat Jones 5–3 and reach his second ranking quarter-final of the season.

Quarter-finals, semi-finals, and final 

The quarter-finals saw Trump defeat Carter 5–3. Both players complained about the playing conditions on the table, which was fixed with wooden boards and a car jack during the mid-session interval. Afterwards, Trump commented that his recent performances were “probably the worst I have played for 10 years". The match between Murphy and Lines went to a deciding frame, which Murphy won to reach his first semi-final since the 2021 World Snooker Championship. Ding defeated Dott 5–1, making breaks of 72, 102, and 64 to reach his first ranking semi-final since the 2019 UK Championship. Selt defeated Gould 5–3.

Selt led by 56 points in the sixth frame, but missed key reds, allowing Ding to level the scores with a 90 clearance. Ding won the seventh frame after Selt overcut a pot on the green. Although Selt won the eighth and ninth frames with breaks of 46 and 59 to move 5–4 ahead, Ding made an 84 break in the 10th frame to force the decider, making their match the 27th of the tournament to go to a deciding frame. Selt missed a black off the spot in the decider, but left Ding snookered, and won the frame to reach his second ranking final. In the other semi-final, Trump won the opening frame against Murphy with a break of 79, but Murphy responded with breaks of 99 and 91 to lead 2–1. Murphy had a chance to make a winning clearance in the fourth but missed a pot on the final red along the top cushion, allowing Trump to level at 2–2. After the mid-session interval, Trump won four consecutive frames, capitalising on missed shots from Murphy, to win the match 6–2 and reach his 35th ranking final.

Trump took a 5–3 lead over Selt in the afternoon session of the final. In the first frame of the evening session, Trump gave away 60 foul points while trying to escape from a series of snookers, but won the frame with an 88 clearance. The players scored a combined 189 points in the frame, just three short of the all-time professional record of 192 set by Peter Lines and Dominic Dale in 2012. From the ninth to the 11th frames, Trump scored 333 points without reply, including a 147 in the 10th frame, the sixth maximum break of his career and the 10th maximum made in a professional snooker final. Selt won the 12th frame, but Trump won the next two with breaks of 82 and 114 to clinch a 10–4 victory, capturing his first ranking title of the season and the 23rd of his career. Trump said afterward that he hoped his performance in the final would foster greater Turkish interest in the sport and inspire some children to take up snooker. His win ensured that he qualified for the 2022 Tour Championship, which was limited to the top eight players on the season's money list. Trump had been 17th on the list before the Welsh Open, but reaching the final of that tournament and winning the Turkish Masters moved him up to fourth place.

Main draw 
The draw for the event is shown below. Players in bold denote match winners.

Top half

Bottom half

Final

Qualifying 

Qualification for the tournament took place from 2 to 6 February 2022 at the Morningside Arena in Leicester, England. Four players withdrew from the tournament before the qualifying round had been completed: Robbie Williams, Noppon Saengkham, Mark Selby, and Neil Robertson. They were replaced by Dylan Emery, Mark Lloyd, Haydon Pinhey and Simon Blackwell respectively.  Originally matches involving the top four seeds and two local Turkish players Ismail Türker and Enes Bakırcı were to be held over and played at the main venue. Robertson and Selby's matches were still held over, but contested by their replacements.

 1–5 
 (64) 4–5 
 (32) 5–0 
 (33) 1–5 
 (16) 5–1 
 (49) 5–1 
 (17) 5–4 
 (48) 5–2 
 (41) 2–5 
 (24) 5–2 
 (56) 5–0 
 (9) 5–2 
 (40) 5–1 
 (25) 5–4 
 (57) 3–5 
 (8) 5–1 
 (5) 5–3 
 5–0 
 (28) 4–5 
 (37) 5–2 
 (12) 3–5 
 (53) 3–5 
 (21) 5–0 
 (44) 5–3 
 (45) 5–3 
 (20) 5–3 
 (52) 2–5 
 (13) 5–3 
 (36) 5–2 
 (29) 5–2 
 (61) 5–3 
 (4) 5–0 
 4–5 
 (62) 5–0 
 (30) 5–4 
 0–5 
 (14) 5–1 
 (51) 5–2 
 (19) 4–5 
 (46) 5–3 
 (43) 5–1 
 (22) 5–0 
 (54) 5–1 
 (11) 5–2 
 (38) 5–1 
 (27) 0–5 
 (59) 5–1 
 (6) 5–2 
 (7) 5–1 
 (58) 5–1 
 (26) 5–4 
 (39) 5–2 
 (10) 3–5 
 (55) 5–2 
 (23) 5–3 
 (42) 5–3 
 (47) 3–5 
 (18) 5–2 
 (50) 5–2 
 (15) 5–1 
 (34) 5–1 
 (31) 5–2 
 (63) 5–1 
 (2) 5–0

Century breaks

Main venue centuries

A total of 50 century breaks were made during the main venue stage.

 147, 120, 116, 114, 110  Judd Trump
 141, 128, 121, 106  John Higgins
 139  Elliot Slessor
 135, 133  Ali Carter
 135  Graeme Dott
 131, 127, 105, 105, 105, 102, 100  Ding Junhui
 131  Robert Milkins
 129  Jak Jones
 129  Xiao Guodong
 123, 105  Martin Gould
 123  Lu Ning
 121  Tom Ford
 120  Mark Davis
 119, 116  Yan Bingtao
 118, 104  Matthew Selt
 118  Liang Wenbo
 117  Yuan Sijun
 116, 100  Kyren Wilson
 113  Oliver Lines
 113  Chris Wakelin
 112  Mark Allen
 111, 107  Wu Yize
 106  Shaun Murphy
 106  Si Jiahui
 104  Matthew Stevens
 102, 101  Hossein Vafaei
 102  Mark Williams
 101  Jordan Brown
 101  Jack Lisowski
 101  Thepchaiya Un-Nooh

Qualifying stage centuries 
A total of 32 century breaks were made during qualification.

 145  Craig Steadman
 142  Elliot Slessor
 141  Scott Donaldson
 138, 120  Ding Junhui
 137, 101  Andrew Higginson
 136  Mark Davis
 130  John Higgins
 129  Joe Perry
 127  Michael White
 122  Dylan Emery
 117, 102  Luca Brecel
 117  Michael Holt
 116, 112  Tom Ford
 114  Ben Hancorn
 114  Jak Jones
 113  Xu Si
 110, 109  Jack Lisowski
 107  Chris Wakelin
 106  Chen Zifan
 105, 101  Zhao Xintong
 104  Li Hang
 103, 101  Stephen Maguire
 101  Jamie Wilson
 101  Yan Bingtao
 100  Ricky Walden

Notes

References 

Snooker ranking tournaments
Turkish Masters
Turkish Masters
Sports competitions in Antalya
International sports competitions hosted by Turkey
Turkish Masters